Lorho is a surname.

List of people with the given name 

 Lorho S. Pfoze, Indian politician

List of people with the surname 

 Marie-France Lorho (born 1964), French politician
 Soso Lorho (1939 – 19 April 2018), Indian politician

Given names
Surnames